Andres X. "Andy" Vargas is a State Representative who represents the  3rd Essex District in the Massachusetts House of Representatives. He represents the city of Haverhill. Vargas serves on the House Committee on Ways and Means, Joint Committee on Community Development and Small Businesses, Joint Committee on Education, Joint Committee on Public Health,  and the Joint Committee on Ways and Means. He is a member of the Massachusetts Black and Latino Legislative Caucus. Vargas is a member of Phi Iota Alpha fraternity.

Vargas won a special election to the House of Representatives in 2017 upon the resignation of longtime incumbent Brian Dempsey. He defeated school committeeman Paul Magliocchetti in the primary, and Republican nominee Shaun Toohey in the general election. Vargas ran unopposed in 2018 and 2020.

In 2021, Vargas announced that he would run for the State Senate the next year upon the retirement of incumbent Diana DiZoglio. However, due to redistricting changing the district lines, Vargas withdrew his candidacy a few months later. He ran for re-election to the House unopposed in 2022.

See also
 2019–2020 Massachusetts legislature
 2021–2022 Massachusetts legislature

References

Living people
21st-century American politicians
Democratic Party members of the Massachusetts House of Representatives
Boston University alumni
Politicians from Haverhill, Massachusetts
Year of birth missing (living people)
Hispanic and Latino American state legislators in Massachusetts